The Old Town Hall is a municipal building in the Market Place in Mansfield, Nottinghamshire, England. The town hall, which was the meeting place of Mansfield District Council, is a Grade II* listed building.

History
In the early 19th century civic meetings were held in the Moot Hall, a building which had been commissioned in 1752 by the Countess of Oxford, whose seat was at Welbeck Abbey.

The foundation stone for the new building was laid by John Coke of Debdale Hall on 21 July 1835. It was designed by William Adams Nicholson in the neoclassical style, built in ashlar stone and completed in 1836. The design involved a symmetrical main frontage with three bays facing onto the Market Square; the central bay, which slightly projected forward, featured a tetrastyle portico with Doric order columns supporting an entablature bearing the town's coat of arms. There were sash windows on the first floor and a clock in the pediment above. Internally, the principal room was the council chamber on the first floor. The Town Improvement Commissioners purchased the building from the Town Hall Company in April 1883 and a public reading room was opened in the building on 28 October 1891.

The area, which became a municipal borough in 1891, saw continued population growth with the development of the coal mining industry in the early 20th century, with the town hall serving as the headquarters of the new borough council. King George V and Queen Mary made an official visit to Mansfield on 25 June 1914, and did so again on 11 July 1928, and on both occasions attended receptions in front of the town hall. The building was requisitioned by the War Office at the start of the Second World War and council meetings were held in the electricity showrooms in Regent Street until the building was handed back in August 1944. The town hall became the local seat of government for the enlarged Mansfield District Council when it was formed in 1974. 

Queen Elizabeth II, accompanied by the Duke of Edinburgh, went on a walkabout along Westgate before signing the visitors book at the town hall on 28 July 1977. The town hall ceased to be the local seat of government when the new council relocated to Mansfield Civic Centre, which was opened by Princess Anne in 1986. However, a tourist information office was established in the town hall in August 1994.

The local competitive swimmer, Rebecca Adlington, who won gold medals for each of the 400 and 800-metre freestyle swimming events at the 2008 Summer Olympics in Beijing, was welcomed home to Mansfield by thousands of people who lined the streets to applaud as she passed by in an open top bus and then appeared at a ceremony at the town hall in August 2008.

Refurbishment
Mansfield District Council identified that the building needed urgent repairs. The adjacent old indoor market was demolished in 2010 to provide car parking. To allow remedial works to start on the old Town Hall structure, Mansfield BID (Business Improvement District), based at the old Town Hall since inception in 2010, moved out in 2015, together with some remaining council administrators. Further upgrading and long-term underuse prompted applications for further works and renovation grants from 2018, including facilitating creation of rentable office accommodation, internal retail areas and renovation of two external retail units.

In October 2021, the council announced a plan to create a new community hub in the old town hall, intending to relocate their own staff together with other local parties having vested interests in the Civic Centre and the area. The project will be subject to a successful bid for funding from central government under the Levelling up scheme announced in 2021.

In March 2022, Mansfield District Council announced that all of the retail units had been let – two external and three internal – to a variety of small businesses. The council's Town Centre Management Team are also based within the building.

See also
Grade II* listed buildings in Nottinghamshire

References

Government buildings completed in 1836
City and town halls in Nottinghamshire
Buildings and structures in Mansfield
Grade II* listed buildings in Nottinghamshire